Natalie Goldberg (born January 4, 1948) is an American popular author and speaker. She is best known for a series of books which explore writing as Zen practice.

Life

Goldberg has studied Zen Buddhism for more than thirty years and practiced with Dainin Katagiri Roshi for six years. Goldberg is a teacher who lives in Santa Fe, New Mexico.  Her 1986 book Writing Down the Bones sold over a million copies and is considered an influential work on the craft of writing. Her 2013 book, The True Secret of Writing, is a follow-up to that work.

Books
Chicken and in Love (1979), 
Writing Down the Bones (1986), 
Wild Mind: Living the Writer's Life (1990)
Long Quiet Highway: Waking Up in America (1993)
Banana Rose (1995)
Living Color: A Writer Paints Her World (1997)
Thunder and Lightning (2000)
The Essential Writer's Notebook (2001)
Top of My Lungs (2002)
The Great Failure (2004)
Old Friend From Far Away: The Practice of Writing Memoir (2008), 
The True Secret of Writing (2013)
The Great Spring: Writing, Zen, and This Zigzag Life (2016), 
Let the Whole Thundering World Come Home: A Memoir (2018), 
Three Simple Lines: A Writer's Pilgrimage into the Heart and Homeland of Haiku (2021), 
Writing Down the Bones Deck: 60 Cards to Free the Writer Within (2021),

References

External links

Natalie Goldberg in Contemporary Authors 
Zen and the Art of Writing – with Natalie Goldberg

Zen Buddhism writers
American Zen Buddhists
Jewish American writers
Living people
1948 births
21st-century American Jews